Season two of Dancing with the Stars premiered on January 6, 2006, on the ABC network.

This season expanded each episode from an hour to 90 minutes, and added an hour-long results show the following night.

On February 24, 98 Degrees singer Drew Lachey and Cheryl Burke were crowned the champions, while San Francisco 49ers wide receiver Jerry Rice and Anna Trebunskaya finished in second place, and WWE wrestler Stacy Keibler and Tony Dovolani finished third.

Cast

Couples
This season expanded from six to ten couples. Rapper Romeo was scheduled to appear in this season, but suffered an injury before the first show and was replaced by his father, Master P. All of the professionals dancers from season one, with the exception of Alec Mazo and Charlotte Jørgensen, returned for season two.

Future appearances
Drew Lachey returned for the All-Stars season, where he was paired with Anna Trebunskaya.

Hosts and judges
Tom Bergeron returned as host, while Samantha Harris replaced Lisa Canning as co-host. Carrie Ann Inaba, Len Goodman and Bruno Tonioli returned as judges.

Scoring charts

Notes

 : This was the lowest score of the week.
 : This was the highest score of the week.
 :  This couple finished in first place.
 :  This couple finished in second place.
 :  This couple finished in third place.
 :  This couple was in the bottom two, but was not eliminated.
 :  This couple was eliminated.

Highest and lowest scoring performances 
The highest and lowest performances in each dance according to the judges' 30-point scale are as follows.

Couples' highest and lowest scoring dances
Scores are based upon a potential 30-point maximum.

Weekly scores
Individual judges' scores in the charts below (given in parentheses) are listed in this order from left to right: Carrie Ann Inaba, Len Goodman, Bruno Tonioli.

Week 1
Each couple performed either the cha-cha-cha or the waltz. Couples are listed in the order they performed.

Week 2
Each couple performed either the quickstep or the rumba. Couples are listed in the order they performed.

Week 3
Each couple performed either the jive or the tango. Couples are listed in the order they performed.

Week 4
Each couple performed either the foxtrot or the paso doble. Couples are listed in the order they performed.

Week 5
Each couple performed the samba, as well as a group salsa. Couples are listed in the order they performed.

Week 6
Each couple performed one unlearned dance, as well as a group Viennese waltz. Couples are listed in the order they performed.

Week 7
Each couple performed two unlearned dances. Couples are listed in the order they performed.

Week 8
Each couple performed three dances, one of which was a freestyle. Couples are listed in the order they performed.

Dance chart
The celebrities and professional partners danced one of these routines for each corresponding week:
Week 1: One unlearned dance (cha-cha-cha or waltz)
Week 2: One unlearned dance (quickstep or rumba)
Week 3: One unlearned dance (jive or tango)
Week 4: One unlearned dance (foxtrot or paso doble)
Week 5: One unlearned dance (samba) & salsa group dance
Week 6: One unlearned dance & Viennese waltz group dance
Week 7: Two unlearned dances
Week 8: Favorite dance, freestyle & randomly chosen dance

Notes

 :  This was the highest scoring dance of the week.
 :  This was the lowest scoring dance of the week.
 :  This couple danced, but received no scores.

References

External links

Dancing with the Stars (American TV series)
2006 American television seasons